One to One was a Canadian pop music group formed in 1984 in Ottawa, Ontario.  They later changed their name to One 2 One. The duo released three albums and produced ten hits on Canadian charts between 1985 and 1992.

Biography
Consisting of vocalist Louise Reny and producer Leslie Howe, One to One evolved out of an Ottawa Valley band called Mainstream, which had toured the local circuit in the late '70s and early '80s performing cover songs. In 1983, Reny and Howe decided to strike out on their own, and after recording a few demos, they signed a two-album deal with Bonaire Records, and flew to West Germany to record.

The dance-fueled debut Forward Your Emotions was released in 1985 and became a smash hit across Canada. The singles "There Was a Time" and "Angel in My Pocket" charted on the Canadian Top 40, and the latter also became a minor hit on the American Billboard Hot 100 charts, reaching #92. A third single, "Black on White", only reached #90 on the Canadian music charts.

Their 1988 follow-up 1-2-1 was a more guitar-based pop album that also became a hit in Canada. The hits "Hold Me Now" and "Do You Believe" climbed into the Canadian Top 40. Two more singles, a cover of The Supremes' "Love Child" and "We've Got the Power", became modest hits as well.

Following the demise of Bonaire Records, the group signed to A&M Records with a new look & sound as One 2 One. Released in 1992, Imagine It was a light 60s/adult contemporary-based album that gave the band another hit with "Peace of Mind (Love Goes On)".  That song also charted on the American Billboard charts at #95. Two more singles, "Memory Lane" and "Friends", reached the Canadian music Top 40 as well.

Following this success, Howe and Reny decided to pursue a different musical direction, and joined with three other musicians in the alternative rock band Sal's Birdland, which later morphed into Artificial Joy Club. The song "Sick and Beautiful" from their debut album Melt went to #1 on the Canadian music Top 40; it also peaked at #11 on the US Radio and Records Alternative chart.
 
In January 2010, Forward Your Emotions was re-released internationally by Wounded Bird Records.

Awards and recognition
In 1986, the band was nominated for three Juno Awards:
 Most Promising Group of the Year
 Producer of the Year (Leslie Howe)
 Recording Engineer of the Year (Leslie Howe)

Howe served as producer for Alanis Morissette's debut album Alanis, which was only released in her native Canada, as well as Ontario based hip hop duo Mix Breed.

Discography

Albums

Singles

References

External links
 One To One bio at CanConRox
 One to One at allmusic

Musical groups established in 1984
Musical groups disestablished in 1992
Musical groups from Ottawa
Canadian pop rock music groups
Canadian dance music groups
Canadian musical duos
1984 establishments in Ontario
1992 disestablishments in Ontario
Male–female musical duos